Mirwais is a first name of Pashto origin.

People with the given name
 Mirwais Ahmadzaï (born 1960), known as Mirwais, Paris-based record producer and songwriter
 Mirwais Azizi founder and owner of Azizi Bank
 Mirwais Ashraf (born 1980), member of the Afghanistan national cricket team
 Mirwais Hotak (1673-1715), Emir of Afghanistan
 Mirwais Jalil (1969-1994), journalist
 Mirwais Naziri, member of the Afghanistan national cricket team
 Mirwais Sadiq (1973-2004), Civil Aviation minister of Afghanistan
 Mirwais Yasini (born 1962), member of the Lower House of the Afghan Parliament